9th Generation is a role-playing game published by Jeff Siadek Enterprises in 1986.

Description
9th Generation is a post-holocaust system of "savage violence, humorously written". The game includes three books: Characters and Combat (36 pages), Game-Master's Guide (16 pages), and an introductory scenario, Desert Ninja, plus a GM's screen.

Publication history
9th Generation was designed by Jeff Siadek, and published by Jeff Siadek Enterprises in 1986 as a 36-page book, a 16-page book, and a 6-page book in an outer folder, a sample character sheet, a cardstock screen, and an outer folder.

Reception

References

Post-apocalyptic role-playing games
Role-playing games introduced in 1986